The 1955–56 Scottish Division Two was won by Queen's Park who, along with second placed Ayr United, were promoted to Division One. Montrose finished bottom.

In the summer of 1955, the Scottish League expanded from 32 clubs to 37 clubs.  The five new teams from the Scottish Division C were: Berwick Rangers, Dumbarton, East Stirlingshire, Montrose and Stranraer (Division C was disbanded, with most of its members, which were reserve teams, moving to a separate Scottish (Reserve) League).

Table

References 

 Scottish Football Archive

Scottish Division Two seasons
2
Scot